Literotica (a portmanteau of literature and erotica) is a free erotic fiction website. It allows any user to register as an author and submit stories and has over a million registered users . Amateur authors contribute stories, poems, essays, illustrated stories and audio stories in a variety of categories.  there were more than 29,000 erotic stories posted. Ant.com ranks the website as the 361st most popular on the internet as of April 9, 2011.  Literotica, a United States-based web site, received 44% of its web traffic from the United States.

, it had 4.5 million visitors per month. In addition to written works, the site includes erotic audio and a store page.

Story submission 

Literotica is among the first adult sites open to story creators, having replaced the usenet erotic story sections. Its few rules prohibit stories about pedophilia and bestiality (except that involving fantasy creatures such as dragons and unicorns), and it is mostly aimed at amateur writers and readers who prefer a largely image-free environment. Stories include short, one-off stories, chain-stories written in collaboration with other authors, and entire novels submitted in a "chapter-by-chapter" mode.

The stories themselves are categorized by various themes, and there are categories for stories with pictures and stories with audio.

Message boards 

Literotica's message boards account for only 6% of literotica's web traffic (Alexa.com, 2008). However, this forum has over 2,420,000 registered members, as of March 2023. Users can participate in 23 forums consisting of 16 English-speaking and seven non-English-speaking language boards. Topics include "Amateur Pictures", "Author's Hangout", "Roleplaying", "Poetry Feedback & Discussion", "Sexual Roleplaying", the unmoderated "General Board", a "How-To" forum, a place for writers to seek advice, and "BDSM" and "LGBT" sections.

Members of the message boards, known as 'Literoticans', 'Litizens' or 'Litsters', sometimes meet in 'Litogethers', where members from particular areas plan an event, in order to socialize with others with whom they have formed online friendships.

After having been on the VBulletin platform since inception, the forum was converted to Xenforo in February 2022.

Literotica chat
The site also provides a series of chat rooms. Originally this service was through DigiChat OR literotica's Java client software, but, because of continued cyber attacks, the chat platform moved to a Flash-based client. As of December 2015, it has been operating on a web-based client. Profiles are shared in the story section, and registration is required. Chat registration is free, and users can create their own public rooms. Chat rooms are moderated, and users who discuss forbidden topics are banned from the system.

Other services 
The site has published story collections under a "Best of" banner and profits from advertising sales and links to webcam, adult video-on-demand, and an online adult store.

CHYOA 
CHYOA is a sister site of Literotica, the users of the former of which may post their own stories. However, after a story is created, other users can add additional threads to expand a story in a different direction, similar to the way a choose-your-own-adventure book allows such changes.

This site has 18 sections in which users may post stories. These sections include "Erotic Couplings," "Romance," "Sci-Fi/Fantasy," "Gay Male," "Fan Fiction," and "Non-English" and "Non-Erotic".

Reception 
Searches for Literotica peak at 4 am. On a list of 7 classiest porn sites by Salon, Literotica came fifth. Bustle recommends Literotica for women. Literotica has been used in scientific research.

Publications 
Literotica has published two books containing collections of stories from the website.
Literotica: The Very Best of Literotica.com, First Edition, published on November 1, 2001.
Literotica 2: The Very Best of Literotica.com, First Edition, published on January 5, 2009.

See also 
 Erotic literature
 List of Internet forums

References

External links
 

American erotica and pornography websites
American literature websites
Erotic fiction
Internet properties established in 1998